Donovan Christopher "Puff" Johnson is an American college basketball player for the North Carolina Tar Heels of the Atlantic Coast Conference.

High school career
Johnson attended Moon Area High School in Moon Township, Pennsylvania for 3 years, helping lead the school to a state championship as a junior. As a senior, Johnson attended Hillcrest Prep in Phoenix, Arizona where he was coached by former NBA player Mike Bibby. A 4 star recruit, he committed to North Carolina over Arizona.

College career
Johnson played very little in his freshman season with the Tar Heels and finished the season averaging just 1 point per game. This limited playing time would initially continue into his sophomore season while battling through injuries. On February 26, 2022, Johnson would score a career high 16 points in an 84-74 victory over rival NC State. In the 2022 NCAA Tournament, Johnson would emerge as a valuable contributor, helping lead the 8 seeded Tar Heels to the Final Four. In the championship game against Kansas, Johnson would score 11 points off the bench before being forced to exit late in the game after collapsing and vomiting; North Carolina would end up losing 69-72.

Career statistics

College

|-
| style="text-align:left;"| 2020–21
| style="text-align:left;"| North Carolina
| 14 || 0 || 4.1 || .429 || .111 || 1.000 || .5 || .1 || .1 || .1 || 1.1
|-
| style="text-align:left;"| 2021–22
| style="text-align:left;"| North Carolina
| 24 || 0 || 10.4 || .459 || .231 || .722 || 2.0 || .5 || .3 || .2 || 3.1
|- class="sortbottom"
| style="text-align:center;" colspan="2"| Career
|| 38 || 0 || 8.1 || .453 || .200 || .750 || 1.4 || .3 || .2 || .1 || 2.4

Personal life
Johnson's older brother Cameron played for the Tar Heels from 2017 to 2019 where he was an All-American and currently plays for the NBA's Brooklyn Nets. Johnson's mother is Croatian American. His nickname "Puff" originated from his enjoyment of Cocoa Puffs when he was young.

References

External links
 North Carolina Tar Heels bio

2000 births
Living people
American men's basketball players
Basketball players from Pittsburgh
North Carolina Tar Heels men's basketball players
People from Moon Township, Allegheny County, Pennsylvania
Small forwards